Robert Valley is a Canadian animator and visual graphic artist. He has a distinct visual style that is influenced by Peter Chung and Gorillaz creator Jamie Hewlett. Valley was born in Vancouver, British Columbia in 1969. After completing a four-year animation program in Vancouver, he moved to San Francisco in 1992.

Career
Valley began by directing animated commercials. In 1997 he started own company, Maverix Studios located in San Francisco. He returned to freelance in 2000 and worked in the UK, France, Spain, New Zealand, and Korea. He now lives in Vancouver, British Columbia. He is most famous for his work with the band Gorillaz.

An early break was his work on Æon Flux. He also did the character designs for Disney's Tron: Uprising and Motorcity. He has also worked on The Beatles: Rock Band, Firebreather, and DC Comics Wonder Woman clips.

He received an Academy Award nomination for his work on Pear Cider and Cigarettes and has directed two episodes for the animated Netflix series Love, Death & Robots.

Filmography
 "Ether Drift Theory" (eighth episode of Aeon Flux) (1995)
 Tron: Uprising (2012)
 Pear Cider and Cigarettes (2016)
 "Zima Blue" (fourteenth episode of Love, Death & Robots, volume one) (2019)
 "Ice" (second episode of Love, Death & Robots, volume two) (2021)
 "It's About Time" (pilot episode of Invincible) (2021)
 "Metamorphosis" (lore trailer for Apex Legends''' tenth season, Emergence) (2021)

Awards
 Nominated: Academy Award for Best Animated Short Film - Pear Cider and Cigarettes''

References

External links
 

Living people
1969 births
American animators
American animated film directors
Canadian animated film directors
Artists from San Francisco
Artists from Vancouver
Film directors from San Francisco
Film directors from Vancouver